C2C: Country to Country is a country music festival that has been held in Europe every year since 2013. It was first held in London on 16–17 March 2013. The festival was the first multi-day country music event in the United Kingdom, since the demise of the popular International Festival of Country Music, which was held at Wembley Arena and hosted by Mervyn Conn. The event was jointly developed by the O2 Arena and SJM Concerts, collaborating with the Country Music Association. In 2019 it had a capacity of 25,000.

In 2013, it was announced that the festival would come to the 3Arena in Dublin on 14–15 March 2014.

The festival expanded even more into Europe, adding additional dates in Sweden and Norway in 2015, and the Netherlands, Germany and Australia in 2019.

As of the 2015 festival, pop-up radio station BBC Radio 2 Country was set up and runs over 4 days, including a live broadcast of the main stage performances.

Since 2016, the festival has run over three nights.

In 2018, Milly Olykan received the Jo Walker-Meador International Award from the Country Music Association for her role in helping AEG concerts develop C2C. The award recognizes outstanding achievement by an individual in advocating and supporting country music's marketing development in territories outside the United States.

Venues

Festival facts
Since the inaugural event, the festival has been hosted in London by BBC Radio 2 presenter Bob Harris.
Little Big Town are the first act to play the festival three times. After appearing at the inaugural 2013 event, they returned in 2016 and headlined in 2018. They were followed by Darius Rucker and Kip Moore who appeared for the third time in 2022. Lady A and Zac Brown Band marked their third appearances in 2023.
Carrie Underwood was the first act to headline the festival twice (2013 & 2016).
Other acts that have played the main stage over multiple years are Brantley Gilbert, Kip Moore, Chris Young, Kristian Bush, Jennifer Nettles, Kacey Musgraves, Chris Stapleton, Cam, Hunter Hayes, Luke Combs, Ashley McBryde, Midland and Thomas Rhett.
Jennifer Nettles was the first artist to play the main stage in consecutive years, appearing as a solo performer in 2017 and as part of Sugarland in 2018.
Sam Hunt, Maren Morris, Drake White, McBryde, Old Dominion, Breland, Matt Stell and Lindsay Ell have been upgraded from their initial appearances on the spotlight stage to the main stage in subsequent years.
In 2019, Catherine McGrath became the first UK country artist to perform on the main stage when she joined Hunter Hayes in London for their duet of "Don't Let Me Forget".
The festival has hosted three members of the Country Music Hall of Fame: Vince Gill, Reba McEntire and Emmylou Harris (as well as future member Marty Stuart) and sixteen members of the Grand Ole Opry: Luke Combs, Dierks Bentley, Gill, Harris, Lady A, Little Big Town, Martina McBride, McEntire, Old Crow Medicine Show, Paisley, Rascal Flatts, Dustin Lynch, Rucker, Stuart, Underwood and Keith Urban.

C2C: Country to Country 2013
The first C2C: Country to Country festival was announced in late November 2012, and was held on 16–17 March 2013 at the O2 Arena in London. Tim McGraw and Carrie Underwood headlined the first and second nights respectively.

Headline acts in bold

London pop-up stages 

 Ags Connolly
 Alan West
 Dean Owens
 James Riley
 Jill Johnson
 Raevennan Husbandes
 Raintown
 Robert Vincent
 The Good Intentions
 The Robbie Boyd Band

C2C: Country to Country 2014
The second C2C: Country to Country festival was held on 15–16 March 2014 at the O2 Arena in London, and on 14–15 March 2014 at The 3Arena in Dublin; aside from Martina McBride, who only played the London show. The Zac Brown Band and Brad Paisley headlined the two nights.

Headline acts in bold

London pop-up stages 

Alan West
Amelia Curran
 Ann Doka
Carolynne Poole
 Dexeter
 Dirty Beggars
Emma Jade
Frankie Davies
Gary Quinn
Hannah Jane Lewis
 Hometown Show
Jessica Clemmons
 Jill & Kate
Lisa Marie Fischer
Lisa Redford
Luke & Mel
Maria Byrne
Tim McKay
Raintown
Star Lane
Stephen Kellogg
Stevie Agnew
Striking Matches
 The Diablos
The Shires
The Sonny Walters Band
 Thorne Hill
Tom Wright
Ward Thomas

C2C: Country to Country 2015
The third C2C: Country to Country festival was held on 7–8 March 2015 at the O2 Arena in London and The 3Arena in Dublin. Extra dates were held in Stockholm and Oslo from 28 February to 1 March 2015 with very similar line-ups. Luke Bryan and Lady Antebellum headlined the two nights. Two events under the C2C banner were also held in Glasgow at the SEC Armadillo. Bryan, Florida Georgia Line and Lindsay Ell played the venue on 3 March, while Lady Antebellum, Kip Moore and Brandy Clark performed on 5 March.

The CMA Songwriters Series took place on 6 March and starred Kix Brooks, Brandy Clark, Jessi Alexander, Jon Randall and Sam Palladio.

Headline acts in bold

London pop-up stages 

Acoustic Journey
Angel Snow
Ann Doka
Aubrie Sellers
Balsamo Deighton
 Callaghan
Carolynne Poole
Case Hardin
Chloe Chadwick
Claydon Connor
David Bradley
Dexeter
 Ellie Dibben
 Emma Jade
 Emma Swindells
Fitzwallace
Flats & Sharps
Gary Quinn
Goat Roper Rodeo Band
Hannah Jane Lewis
Holloway Road
Hometown Show
Honey Ryder
InBlauK
Jeannine Barry
Jess and the Bandits
Jess Roberts
Jon Randall and Jessi Alexander
Katie Armiger
Katie Nicholas
Kimmie Rhodes
Laura Oakes
Lewis & Leigh
 Lisa Redford
 Liv Austen
Loud Mountains
Lucy May
Megan O’Neill
Michele Stodart
Miller's Daughter
Mim Grey
Paul Carella
 Pauper Kings
Raintown
Sam Hunt
Sasha McVeigh
Sonia Leigh
Stephanie Manns
Steve Young
Striking Matches
Talia Simone
The Cains Trio
The Dirty Beggars
The James Clode Band
 The Rising
The Shires
The Tuesday Syndicate
Ward Thomas
Winter's Hill
 Woody Pines
 Worry Dolls

C2C: Country to Country 2016
The fourth C2C: Country to Country festival was held over three nights from 11 to 13 March 2016. Glasgow joined London and Dublin as the third venue. Carrie Underwood was the first headliner to be announced at all three venues, becoming the festival's first returning headliner following her appearance in 2013. The launch party was held at the Brooklyn Bowl inside the O2 Arena in London on 6 October 2015, the event was followed by a headlining Little Big Town concert. At the launch party it was announced that Miranda Lambert and Eric Church would join Carrie Underwood as the other headliners, although Miranda Lambert's involvement was leaked earlier that day by her own website, which also listed her three support acts on the bill. The full line up for the Yamaha Music Stage in London (formally named the Satellite Stage) was announced on 16 November 2015.

The CMA Songwriters series acted as the beginning of C2C, taking place on 9 March and featuring Shane McAnally, Charlie Worsham, Ashley Monroe, Lori McKenna and Charles Esten as well as a special surprise appearance from Miranda Lambert.

Headline acts in bold
Satellite Stage acts in italics

London pop-up stages 

A Thousand Horses
Alan West and Steve Black
 Alice Wallace
American Young
Ashley Campbell
Ashton Lane
 Balsamo Deighton
Barry Dean 
 Benjamin Folke Thomas
Brooke Eden
 Callaghan
Carolynne Poole
Case Hardin
CC Smugglers
Charles Esten 
Charlie Worsham
Chisum Cattle Co.
Cooper & Davies
Crash N Recovery
Darline
David Nail
 Dexeter
Gary Burr 
Georgia Middleman 
Western Tears
Emma Stevens
 Erin Kinsey
Frankie Davies
Foreign Affairs
High Valley
Holloway Road
Honey Ryder
 ILONA
Jeannine Barry
Jess and the Bandits
Jessi Alexander 
Laura Oakes
Lauren Alaina
Lori McKenna 
Lucy May
Luke and Mel
Kimmie Rhodes
 Knoxville Highway
Maren Morris 
Megan O’Neill
Old Dominion 
ORFILA
Outlander
Paul Carella
 Pauper Kings
Phil Vassar
Rackhouse Pilfer
Ray Peters and the Smokey Turtle Band
Red Pine Timber Company
Red Sky July
Robert Vincent
Sadie and the Hotheads
Sam Coe and the Longshadows
Sarah Darling
Shane McAnally 
Sonia Leigh
Southern Companion
Southern Junction
Striking Matches 
The Rising
The Shires
 Texas Martha and the House of Twang
Wire and Wool

C2C: Country to Country 2017
The fifth C2C festival was announced at the conclusion of the previous year's festival. It ran over three nights from 10 to 12 March 2017. Early bird tickets for the o2 Arena in London went on sale at 9.00am on 18 March 2016. The line-up was announced in "waves", with the first wave being announced on 24 October 2016 via a launch event at the Brooklyn Bowl. The 3-day breakdown was released on 1 November, with Reba McEntire and Marty Stuart announced as the final two acts the following day at 4pm. Una Healy appeared on the Spotlight Stage in Dublin on 12 March, opening for Reba.

The remainder of the Yamaha Music Stage acts for London were announced on 24 January 2017.

The CMA Songwriters Series returned to kick off the festival on 9 March and featured Kristian Bush, Maren Morris, Mac McAnally, Drake White and Liz Rose.

Headline acts in bold
Satellite Stage acts in italics

Note: The set lists below are from the London show, with the exception of Cam's set (which is taken from her Glasgow performance).

London pop-up stages 

Backwoods Creek
Bailey Bryan
 Beth Thornton
 Caitlin Koch
Canaan Smith 
Case Hardin
Cassadee Pope 
Catherine McGrath
Charlie Worsham 
Chase Bryant
Chisum Cattle Co.
Clara Bond
Dana Immanuel
Dominic Halpin
Drake White
Gary Quinn
Have Mercy Las Vegas
 Holloway Road
Jade Helliwell
Jake Morrell
 Jamie Stanton and Roadkill Revival
Jana Kramer
Jarrod Dickenson
Jeff Cohen 
Josh Osborne 
Laura Evans
 Legends of Country
Lisa McHugh
Logan Brill 
Lucie Silvas 
Katy Hurt
Kevin McGuire
Kristian Bush
Kete Bowers
Mac McAnally
 Martha L. Healy
Melanie
 Miss Winter
Orfila
Rackhouse Pilfer
Raintown
Robert Chaney
Sam Coe and the Longshadows
Sarah Darling
Seth Ennis 
Shootin' The Crow
Square One
 Smooth Hound Smith
Temecula Road
The Hardy Band
The Honey Ants
The Long Haul Band
The Shires
The Wandering Hearts
Thunderbridge Bluegrass Band
Trea Landon
Twinnie-Lee Moore
Una Healy
Ward Thomas
Worry Dolls

 Also part of the Bluebird Café at C2C event

C2C: Country to Country 2018
The sixth C2C festival was announced on the final day of the 2017 festival and ran over three nights from 9–11 March 2018. On 28 September 2017, Bob Harris announced that the first 2018 headliners would be Tim McGraw and Faith Hill (who would be bringing their Soul2Soul Tour to the UK for the very first time) on his BBC Radio 2 programme. Kelsea Ballerini was announced on 3 October by Ricky Ross on BBC Radio Scotland. On 5 October, Little Big Town were confirmed as the second headline act with majority of the line-up being revealed the following day on 6 October at the official launch event. On 16 October, Old Dominion were announced along with the three day breakdown. It was also revealed that Ashley Campbell would perform a special tribute to her father, Glen Campbell in London. On 23 November, Brett Young was confirmed for the main stage in Glasgow and Dublin as well as the Yamaha stage in London. For the first time, C2C announced that Glasgow would feature a Spotlight stage. On 8 December, Sugarland were announced as the final main stage act. Composed of C2C alumni Kristian Bush and Jennifer Nettles, the duo reformed in 2017 and are billed as "special guests", their appearances was their first full-band shows in five years.

The CMA Songwriters Series held on 8 March featured Brett James, Natalie Hemby, Kip Moore, Nicolle Galyon and Luke Combs.

Headline acts in bold, Satellite stage acts in italics

London pop-up stages 

American Young
Andy Brown
Ashley Campbell
Ashley McBryde
Brett Young
 Catherine McGrath
Clara Bond
Danielle Bradbery
 Days Are Done
Delta Rae
DJ Hish
Elles Bailey
FAYRE
 Ferris and Sylvester
High Valley
Holloway Road
Jake Morrell
 Jeannine Barry
Jillian Jacqueline
 Katy Hurt
 Kerri Watt
Keywest
LANCO
 Lars Pluto
Leslie Satcher
Levi Hummon
Lindsay Ell
Liv Austen
Liz McClarnon
 Lost Hollow
Lukas Nelson
Mo Pitney
Morgan Evans
 O & O
Peter Donegan
Russell Dickerson
Ryan Hurd
Ryan Kinder
Sammie Jay
Sarah Darling
Stephanie Quayle
The Adelaides
The Grahams
The Shires
The Wandering Hearts
Twinnie-Lee Moore
Una Healy
Walker Hayes
Ward Thomas

 Part of the Bluebird Café at C2C event

C2C: Country to Country 2019
The seventh C2C festival was announced on the final day of the 2018 festival and ran over three nights from 8–10 March 2019. The line-up was announced on 22 October 2018 during the CMA songwriters tour at Shepherd's Bush Empire, with tickets going on sale on 26 October 2018. On 30 October 2018, C2C announced that a one night C2C would take place at AFAS Live in Amsterdam, and a two night festival in Berlin at the Verti Music Hall. Additionally, two events under the C2C banner would take place in Australia, albeit with a different line-up to the rest of the events held in 2019. Midland, Kelsea Ballerini, Eric Paslay, RaeLynn, Blanco Brown, The McClymonts and headliner Tim McGraw are set to perform in Sydney and Brisbane on 28 and 29 September respectively.

The CMA Songwriters Series was held on 7 March 2019 and featured Cam, Jimmie Allen, Laura Veltz, Ross Copperman and Travis Denning.

Headline acts in bold, Satellite stage acts in italics

London pop-up stages 

Abby Anderson
 Adam Hambrick
 Backwoods Creek
Caroline Jones
Catherine McGrath
 CC Smugglers
Copper Viper
Craig Campbell
Fairground Saints
Foreign Affairs
DJ Hish
[Holly Rose Webber
 Ingrid Andress
Jade Helliwell
Jake Morrell
James Barker Band
Jeff Cohen
Jimmie Allen
 Kaylee Bell
Kelly Archer
 Kenny Foster]
Kerri Watt
 Lainey Wilson
Laura Oakes
 Lauren Jenkins
Lisa Wright
Logan Mize
 Megan O'Neill
Michael Ray
 Molly-Anne
 Morganway
Noah Schnacky
 Noble Jacks
RaeLynn
 Remember Monday
Robert Vincent
Runaway June
Sam Lewis
Sam Palladio
Sarah Darling
 The Adelaides
 The Blue Highways
 The Wandering Hearts
 Travis Denning
Twinnie-Lee Moore

 Also part of the Bluebird Café at C2C event

C2C: Country to Country 2020/21
The eighth consecutive C2C festival was announced during the final day of the 2019 edition, and was planned to have run over three nights from 13 to 15 March 2020 in London, Glasgow and Dublin. C2C was also planned to have returned to Berlin from 6–8 March, the Netherlands between 7 and 8 March and Australia at an unspecified date. The line-up was at the official launch event on 21 October 2019 at Cadogan Hall during the Introducing Nashville concert featuring performances by Danielle Bradbery, Chris Lane, Travis Denning and Rachel Wammack. Old Dominion were originally scheduled to perform but withdrew on 6 March 2020 due to concerns over the COVID-19 pandemic and they were replaced by The Shires who were to be the first UK-grown country act to perform on the main stage.

The CMA Songwriters Series was set to feature Tenille Townes, Phil Barton, Caylee Hammack, Niko Moon and Jaren Johnston. The original line-up also included Hillary Lindsey, Liz Rose and Lori McKenna; however, they withdrew on 6 March. The show was cancelled on 12 March. The COVID-19 pandemic put a hold on all scheduled concerts and festivals around the world.
As concerns over the pandemic worsened and several countries began implementing travel restrictions, the 2020 Country to Country festival was cancelled. The main stage was due to feature Eric Church, Darius Rucker and Luke Combs as headliners with Tanya Tucker, Old Crow Medicine Show, The Cadillac Three, Charles Esten, Brett Young, Runaway June, Jordan Davis, Tenille Townes, Eric Paslay and Abby Anderson also performing.

The 2021 edition of C2C was also cancelled due to the ongoing pandemic, with the new dates for 2022 being announced as 11–13 March.

C2C: Country to Country 2022
After two years of cancellation, the initial lineup for the eighth C2C festival was announced on 13 September 2021. Luke Combs and Darius Rucker return as headliners after previously being booked for the 2020 festival and Miranda Lambert returns to headline for the second time, replacing Eric Church whose American tour dates clashed with the 2022 festival. Brett Young and Runaway June also remained in the lineup from the cancelled 2020 event, though Runaway June later cancelled due to a pregnancy within the group and were replaced by Tenille Townes. On December 15, Priscilla Block, Tiera Kennedy and Morgan Wade were announced as the Introducing Nashville artists. The pop-up acts were announced on 14 February. Charles Kelley from Lady A (with Russell Dickerson) and Ed Sheeran (with Luke Combs) both made guest appearances at the London shows.

Headline acts in bold, Satellite stage acts in italics

London pop-up stages 

Alex Hall
Avery Anna
Breland
Brittney Spencer
Caitlyn Smith
Callie Twisselman
Callista Clark
Catherine McGrath
Danny McMahon
Eleri Angharad
Eric & Jensen
Erin Kinsey
Essex County
Everette
Gary Quinn
Harleymoon Kemp
Hayley McKay
Izzie Walsh
Jaret Reddick
Jeannine Barry
Jess Thristan
Jess Moskaluke
Kaitlyn Baker
Katy Hurt
Kezia Gill
King Calaway
Laci Kaye Booth
Laine Hardy
Laura Oakes
Lucy Grubb
Matt Stell
Morganway
Pete Gow
Robyn Ottolini
Ruthie Collins
Seaforth
Shy Carter
Tebey
The County Affair
The Shires
Tenille Arts
Tim Hicks
Tim Prottey-Jones
Tony Arata
Twinnie-Lee Moore
Walker Country

 Also part of the Bluebird Café at C2C event

C2C: Country to Country 2023
The 2023 lineup was announced on 17 October 2022 at an official launch event at Bush Hall which featured performances from Ben Earle and Catherine McGrath. On 5 December 2022, Morgan Evans and the Introducing Nashville artists (Tyler Braden, Caylee Hammack and Alana Springsteen) were revealed as the final main stage artists and the London Spotlight Stage artists were also announced. The rest of the lineup was revealed on 30 January 2023. The CMA Songwriter's event, which will took place on 9 March, featured Nate Smith, Lainey Wilson and Dalton Dover. Elvie Shane was originally scheduled to appear at the festival but was unable to attend due to a broken leg. Niall Horan made a guest appearance at the London show.

Headline acts in bold, Satellite stage acts in italics

London pop-up stages 

49 Winchester
Adam Doleac
Alyssa Bonagura
Alexandra Kay
Amanda Shires
Ashley Cooke
Brian Collins
Brooke Law
Caroline Jones
Catie Offerman
Chase McDaniel
Corey Kent
Dan Davidson
Drake Milligan
Emma Walker
Eric & Jensen
First Time Flyers
George Birge
Haley Mae Campbell
Hannah Ellis
Jade Helliwell
Jeff Cohen
Jess & The Bandits
Jillian Jacqueline
Jolie Harvey
Jonathan Terrell
Kameron Marlowe
Kezia Gill
Leah Blevins
Lucy May
MacKenzie Porter
Madeleine Edwards
Megan McKenna
Nate Smith
Paris Adams
Pillbox Patti
Randall King
Remember Monday
Sam Williams
Smithfield
Thomas Kavanagh
Tigirlily Gold
Two Ways Home
Tyler Booth
Ward Thomas
Willie Jones

 Also part of the Bluebird Café at C2C event

C2C: Country to Country 2024
Country to Country will return on 8–10 March 2024. The festival will be held in Belfast for the first time this year, after being held in Dublin since 2014.

See also
List of country music festivals
List of folk festivals

References

External links

 

Country music festivals in the United Kingdom
Folk festivals in Ireland
Folk festivals in the United Kingdom
Music festivals established in 2013
Music festivals in England
Music festivals in London